Hercules Kyvelos (born February 25, 1975) is a Canadian boxer in the Welterweight division and is the former Canadian Welterweight Champion. He fought at the 1996 Summer Olympics in Atlanta, Georgia.

Early life
Hercules was born in Canada but he has Greek roots.

Amateur career
He represented his native country at the 1996 Summer Olympics in Atlanta, Georgia. A year before, Kyvelos won the bronze medal at the 1995 Pan American Games in Mar del Plata, Argentina. He also twice won the National Canadian Golden Gloves.

Pro career
After the Atlanta Games he became a professional boxer, winning his debut against Ryan Jones by first-round knockout.

In February 2000, Hercules won the Canadian Welterweight Championship by defeating fellow countryman Fitz Vanderpool.

WBO Welterweight Championship
On January 31, 2004, Kyvelos lost for the first time as a professional, when he faced WBO Welterweight Champion, American Antonio Margarito in Phoenix, Arizona. He lost by a second-round knockout.

In his next fight he was also stopped by knockout against Mexican Cosme Rivera, the fight was an IBF Welterweight Title Eliminator.

Personal life
As of 2007, Hercules is retired from boxing and is working as a real estate agent in Montreal.

References

External links
Canadian Olympic Committee

1975 births
Living people
Olympic boxers of Canada
Boxers from Montreal
Canadian people of Greek descent
Welterweight boxers
Boxers at the 1995 Pan American Games
Boxers at the 1996 Summer Olympics
Pan American Games bronze medalists for Canada
Canadian male boxers
Pan American Games medalists in boxing
Medalists at the 1995 Pan American Games